Bruno Foresti  (6 May 1923 – 26 July 2022) was an Italian prelate of Catholic Church. At the time of his death at age , he was the oldest living Catholic bishop from Italy.

Foresti was born in Tavernola Bergamasca, Italy and was ordained a priest on 7 April 1946. Foresti was appointed auxiliary bishop to the Archdiocese of Modena-Nonantola on 12 December 1974 as well as Titular Bishop of Plestia and ordained bishop on 10 January 1975. Foresti was then appointed Archbishop of the Archdiocese of Modena-Nonantola on 2 April 1976. Foresti's final appointment was to bishop of the Diocese of Brescia and he retired as bishop of Brescia on 15 December 1998.

References

External links
Brescia Diocese (Italian)

1923 births
2022 deaths
20th-century Italian Roman Catholic bishops
21st-century Italian Roman Catholic bishops
20th-century Italian Roman Catholic archbishops
21st-century Italian Roman Catholic archbishops
Bishops of Brescia
Clergy from the Province of Bergamo